Visconti is a surname which may refer to:

Italian noble families
 Visconti of Milan, ruled Milan from 1277 to 1447
 Visconti di Modrone, collateral branch of the Visconti of Milan
 Visconti of Pisa and Sardinia, ruled Gallura in Sardinia from 1207 to 1250

People

Pre-20th century 
 Alfonso Visconti (1552–1608), Roman Catholic cardinal
 Antonio Eugenio Visconti (1713–1788), Roman Catholic cardinal
 Azzone Visconti (1302–1339), lord of Milan
 Bartolomeo Visconti (died 1457), Roman Catholic prelate and Bishop of Novara
 Bernabò Visconti (1323–1385), Italian soldier and lord of Milan
 Caterina Visconti (1361–1404), Duchess of Milan
 Ennio Quirino Visconti (1751–1818), Italian antiquarian and art historian
 Federico Visconti (1617–1693), Cardinal and Archbishop of Milan from 1681 to 1693
 Filippo Maria Visconti (1392–1447), Duke of Milan
 Filippo Visconti (bishop) (1596–1664), Roman Catholic Bishop of Catanzaro
 Filippo Maria Visconti (bishop) (1721–1801), Archbishop of Milan
 Galeazzo Visconti (disambiguation), several people
 Gaspare Visconti (1538–1595), Archbishop of Milan from 1584 to 1595
 Gian Maria Visconti (1388–1412), Duke of Milan
 Giovanni Visconti (disambiguation), several people
 John of Gallura (died 1275), John (or Giovanni) Visconti, Judge of Gallura, Sardinian ruler
 Louis Visconti (1791–1853), Italian-born French architect
 Ottone Visconti (1207–1295), Archbishop of Milan and lord of Milan
 Teobaldo Visconti (1210–1276), Pope Gregory X
 Valentina Visconti, Duchess of Orléans (1371–1408)
 Valentina Visconti, Queen of Cyprus (c. 1357–before September 1393)

20th-21st century 
 Adriano Visconti (1915–1945), Italian World War II flying ace
 Gary Visconti (born 1945), American former figure skater
 Giovanni Visconti (cyclist) (born 1983), Italian road bicycle racer
 Luchino Visconti (1906–1976), Italian film, theatre, and opera director
 Tony Visconti (born 1944), American record producer, musician and singer

Fictional characters
 Ercole Visconti, in the Pixar film Luca

Other
 Visconti (company), an Italian manufacturer of pens and other luxury goods